Bo Jensen (born 1976) is an internationally elite curler from Denmark.

For the 2009/2010 competitive season he has played Second for Ulrik Schmidt's team from Denmark. At the 2009 Moncton World Championships Team Denmark placed seventh with a 5 - 6 record. This, combined with their eleventh and ninth-place finishes at the 2007 and 2008 Worlds, earned them the eighth qualifying spot for the 2010 Winter Olympics held in Vancouver, British Columbia, Canada.

Teammates

References

External links
 

1976 births
Living people
Olympic curlers of Denmark
Curlers at the 2010 Winter Olympics
Danish male curlers
21st-century Danish people